Christian Jacques Dutoit (18 October 1940 – 5 September 2021) was a French journalist.

Biography
He also headed the development and launch of La Cinq in 1985. He became deputy managing director of TF1 in 1987 and was the founder of La Chaîne Info in 1993. In 1995, he designed and launched 18 channels in the AB Sat package and developed i>Télé for Groupe Canal+ in 1997. In 2002, he became director of productions for Expand.

From 2003 to 2009, Dutoit was a member of the Conseil supérieur de l'audiovisuel. In 2009, he joined the French Economic, Social and Environmental Council.

Christian Dutoit died on 5 September 2021 at the age of 80.

Distinctions
Knight of the Legion of Honour (1994)
Combatant's Cross
Medal of the Nation's Gratitude

References

1940 births
2021 deaths
French journalists
People from Rabat
Chevaliers of the Légion d'honneur